Robert James Brentano (19 May 1926 – 21 November 2002) was a prize-winning author and historian of medieval England and Italy. One of his books, Two churches: England and Italy in the thirteenth century, won the 1968 John Gilmary Shea Prize and the Haskins Medal. Brentano was elected to the American Academy of Arts and Sciences in 1978 and the American Philosophical Society in 1996.

Works

References

1926 births
2002 deaths
20th-century American historians
20th-century American male writers
American medievalists
Swarthmore College alumni
University of California faculty
American male non-fiction writers
Members of the American Philosophical Society